Logan Pause (born August 22, 1981) is an American former soccer player and coach who spent his entire twelve-year professional career with the Chicago Fire in Major League Soccer.

Playing career

College and amateur
After attending  Jordan High School in Durham, North Carolina, Pause played college soccer at the University of North Carolina from 2000 to 2002. After a 2002 season in which he co-captained the Tar Heels and played everywhere from central defense to attacking midfield due to injuries, Pause signed a Project-40 contract with MLS. During the 2002 collegiate off-season, Pause played for the Raleigh CASL Elite of the fourth division Premier Development League.

Professional
Pause was selected 24th overall in the 2003 MLS SuperDraft by The Fire. He surprised many by seeing immediate time with the team, finishing the season with 21 appearances and 15 starts for a Fire team that won the MLS Supporters' Shield and the U.S. Open Cup. Pause played the same role for the Fire in 2004, filling in for Jesse Marsch and Chris Armas, starting 19 games and adding two assists.

Pause served primarily as the club's defensive midfielder after Armas retired. He made his 200th league appearance for the Fire on March 26, 2011 in a 3-2 win over Sporting Kansas City.

With the additions of Arévalo Ríos and Jeff Larentowicz in the 2013 MLS season, Pause saw a reduction in playing time, appearing in only 15 matches and starting 11 of those. Following the season's conclusion Pause was made available in the 2013 MLS Re-Entry Draft but eventually agreed to new a contract ahead of the 2014 season.

Logan Pause has retired at the end of 2014 MLS season.  He has spent his entire 12-year professional career playing for Chicago Fire.

On November 3, 2014 Pause was announced the Vice President of the Chicago Fire Soccer Club and will begin his new role as of December 1, 2014.

International
Pause played for a range of United States youth national teams, including the Under-23's during Olympic Qualifying.

Pause was called up for the United States National Team for the 2009 CONCACAF Gold Cup held in the United States, his first call up to the United States full squad. On July 4, 2009 Pause received his first cap playing the entire 90 minutes against Grenada while also registering an assist on Robbie Rogers' goal.

Career statistics

Chicago Fire Player Registry

Coaching career
In 2017, Pause was named Head Coach for Orange County SC playing in USL Championship.  Following the 2017 USL Season, Pause and OCSC parted ways, announced November 2017.

In 2019 Pause became the head coach of Chicago FC United.

Post soccer life 
In 2018 Pause joined the Northwestern Medical Group as a program director where he coordinates wellness programs for the group's physicians.

Honors

Chicago Fire
Lamar Hunt U.S. Open Cup (2):
Winner: 2003, 2006
MLS Supporters' Shield (1):
Winner: 2003

Individual
Chicago Fire Most Valuable Player (1):
Winner: 2010
MLS Fair Play Award (1):
Winner: 2012

References

External links
 
 

1981 births
Living people
American soccer players
Chicago Fire FC players
North Carolina FC U23 players
North Carolina Tar Heels men's soccer players
United States men's international soccer players
Major League Soccer players
USL League Two players
2009 CONCACAF Gold Cup players
United States men's under-23 international soccer players
Chicago Fire FC draft picks
Soccer players from North Carolina
Chicago Fire FC non-playing staff
Association football midfielders
Orange County SC coaches
American soccer coaches